Jane Green (born in 1968) also known by her married name, Jane Green Warburg, is an English-born American author whose works of fiction are American and international best-sellers. As of 2014, Green's books had sold in excess of 10 million copies globally, with translations of them appearing in thirty-one languages, making her a leading author, globally, of commercial women's fiction. With regard to genres, she has been described as "[o]ne of the first of the chick lit" authors, and as a founding author of the form of fiction sometimes referred to as "mum lit."

Biography
Jane Green was born in London, England, on 31 May 1968. She attended South Hampstead High School, and went on to study fine art at Aberystwyth University. and Ravensbourne School of Art.

Career
Green was employed by Granada TV as a publicist in her early 20s. She continued working as a journalist throughout her twenties, writing women's features for publications including The Daily Express, The Daily Mail, and  Cosmopolitan magazine.

Green left The Daily Express in 1996, to begin work which in the publication of her first book, Straight Talking seven months later, for which there was a bidding war, and which became a best-seller. The book launched her career as "the queen of chick lit". Her novels include Jemima J: A Novel About Ugly Ducklings and Swans (1998), Life Swap (UK; Swapping Lives in the US, 2006), Second Chance (2007), The Beach House (2008), and Saving Grace (2015), five of seventeen novels through 2016 that became New York Times best-sellers. As of 2014, Green had over 10 million books in print, and many global best-sellers. "Jane Green" is the name she continued to use in her writing career, including after she married Ian Warburg of the Warburg banking family, her second spouse, and legally took his name.

Green has taught at writers' conferences, and writes for various publications including Cosmopolitan magazine, The Sunday Times, The Daily Telegraph, Parade magazine, and The Huffington Post. A graduate of the French Culinary Institute, she is publishing a cookbook, Good Taste. As of this date, Green is also writing as a weekly column for The Lady magazine in the United Kingdom. Her contribution of an e-book on the marriages of English royals for ABC News, Green became an ABC News Radio correspondent, and covered the 2011 wedding of "Kate" Middleton to England's Prince William.

Green contributed a story on the virtue of marital fidelity for The Moth Radio Hour, which was recorded in November 2015, and aired in September 2016.

Personal life
As of 2014, Green lived in Westport, Connecticut, with her second husband, investment adviser Ian Warburg (grandson of Mary and Edward Warburg), whom she married 6 March 2009. Green has four children from her first marriage to American investment banker Davide Burke  and two stepchildren.

Books

 Jemima J: A Novel About Ugly Ducklings and Swans (1998)Mr. Maybe (2001)Bookends (2002)Babyville:  A Novel (2003)Straight Talking: A NovelSpellbound [UK] / To Have and to Hold [US]The Other Woman:  A Novel (2005)This Christmas (2005)Life Swap [UK] / Swapping Lives [US] (2006)Second Chance (2007)The Beach House (2008)Girl Friday [UK] / Dune Road [US] (2009)The Love Verb [UK] / Promises to Keep [US] (2010)The Patchwork Marriage [UK] / Another Piece of my Heart [US] (2012)The Accidental Husband [UK] / Family Pictures [US] (2013)Tempting Fate (2014)Saving Grace (2015)Cat and Jemima J (novella) (2015)Summer Secrets (2015)Falling: A Love Story (2016)Good Taste [a food & entertaining/nonfiction book] (2016)The Sunshine Sisters (2017)The Friends We Keep (2019)Sister Stardust'' (2022)

References

Further reading

External links
 More than 20 independent or semi-independent published sources of information on the title subject (see "Press")
 Official website

1968 births
English women novelists
British chick lit writers
Writers from London
Alumni of Aberystwyth University
Living people
People educated at South Hampstead High School
Warburg family